Abu Taher (1954-1999) was a Bangladeshi music director. He has scored music for 31 films. The following is a list of films he scored:

1980s

1990s

2000s

Year Unknown

Background Score Only

Non-film albums

As lyricist

References

Sources
 

Discographies of Bangladeshi artists